One Man's Meat may refer to:

One Man's Meat, a 1942 book by E. B. White
One Man's Meat, a 1977 detective novel by Colin Watson
"One Man's Meat", a short story by Jeffrey Archer
"One Man's Meat", a song by  Fad Gadget from his 1984 album Gag
"One Man's Meat", a song by Deep Purple from their 1993 album The Battle Rages On
"One Man's Meat", a television play by British comedian, Ronnie Barker under the pseudonym, Jack Goetz. Part of the Seven of One series.
One Man's Meat is the fifth studio album of the actor Viggo Mortensen.